Van Beusekom is a Dutch surname. Notable people with the surname include:

Joke van Beusekom (born 1952), Dutch badminton player
Willem van Beusekom (1947–2006), Dutch broadcaster and television presenter

See also
Leen van Beuzekom, Indonesian footballer

Dutch-language surnames